Vernon Vivian "Jake, Jumpin' Jackie" Forbes (July 4, 1897 – December 30, 1985) was a Canadian ice hockey goaltender who played thirteen seasons in the National Hockey League for the Toronto St. Patricks, Hamilton Tigers, New York Americans and Philadelphia Quakers. He also played several years in different minor leagues, retiring in 1936. He is notable for being the first NHL player to sit out a season over a contract dispute.

Playing career
Nicknamed "Jumpin' Jackie", Forbes was involved in the infamous 1925 Hamilton Tigers players' strike. Before becoming involved in the players strike, Forbes played for the Toronto St. Patricks and sat out the entire 1921–22 NHL season while holding out for a $2500 salary. In doing so, Forbes became the first NHL player to sit out an entire season due to a contract dispute. His contract was then sold to Hamilton after the season ended. He spent most of his career with the Hamilton Tigers/New York Americans franchise. After getting into two playoff games in 1921, his first full season, he never played another post-season game despite not retiring from the league for another twelve years. His only other opportunity at winning a Stanley Cup was foiled by the Hamilton players strike. In his NHL career, he finished with 84 wins, 114 losses and 11 ties, with a 2.76 goals against average (GAA).

He was the last surviving former player of the Hamilton Tigers.

Career statistics

Regular season and playoffs

References

External links
 
 

1897 births
1985 deaths
Bronx Tigers players
Canadian ice hockey goaltenders
Hamilton Tigers (ice hockey) players
London Tecumsehs players
New Haven Eagles players
New York Americans players
Niagara Falls Cataracts players
Philadelphia Quakers (NHL) players
Providence Reds players
Rochester Cardinals players
Springfield Indians players
Ice hockey people from Toronto
Syracuse Stars (IHL) players
Toronto St. Pats players
Canadian expatriate ice hockey players in the United States